{{DISPLAYTITLE:Cav1.2}}

Calcium channel, voltage-dependent, L type, alpha 1C subunit (also known as Cav1.2) is a protein that in humans is encoded by the CACNA1C gene. Cav1.2 is a subunit of L-type voltage-dependent calcium channel.

Structure and function 

This gene encodes an alpha-1 subunit of a voltage-dependent calcium channel. Calcium channels mediate the influx of calcium ions (Ca2+) into the cell upon membrane polarization (see membrane potential and calcium in biology).

The alpha-1 subunit consists of 24 transmembrane segments and forms the pore through which ions pass into the cell. The calcium channel consists of a complex of alpha-1, alpha-2/delta and beta subunits in a 1:1:1 ratio. The S3-S4 linkers of Cav1.2 determine the gating phenotype and modulated gating kinetics of the channel. Cav1.2 is widely expressed in the smooth muscle, pancreatic cells, fibroblasts, and neurons. However, it is particularly important and well known for its expression in the heart where it mediates L-type currents, which causes calcium-induced calcium release from the ER Stores via ryanodine receptors. It depolarizes at -30mV and helps define the shape of the action potential in cardiac and smooth muscle. The protein encoded by this gene binds to and is inhibited by dihydropyridine. In the arteries of the brain, high levels of calcium in mitochondria elevates activity of nuclear factor kappa B NF-κB and transcription of CACNA1c and functional Cav1.2 expression increases. Cav1.2 also regulates levels of osteoprotegerin.

CaV1.2 is inhibited by the action of STIM1.

Regulation
The activity of CaV1.2 channels is tightly regulated by the Ca2+ signals they produce. An increase in intracellular Ca2+ concentration implicated in Cav1.2 facilitation, a form of positive feedback called Ca2+-dependent facilitation, that amplifies Ca2+ influx. In addition, increasing influx intracellular Ca2+ concentration has implicated to exert the opposite effect Ca2+ dependent inactivation. These activation and inactivation mechanisms both involve Ca2+ binding to calmodulin (CaM) in the IQ domain in the C-terminal tail of these channels. Cav1.2 channels are arranged in cluster of eight, on average, in the cell membrane. When calcium ions bind to calmodulin, which in turn binds to a Cav1.2 channel, it allows the Cav1.2 channels within a cluster to interact with each other. This results in channels working cooperatively when they open at the same time to allow more calcium ions to enter and then close together to allow the cell to relax.

Clinical significance 

Mutation in the CACNA1C gene, the single-nucleotide polymorphism located in the third intron of the Cav1.2 gene, are associated with a variant of Long QT syndrome called Timothy's syndrome and more broadly with other CACNA1C-related disorders, and also with Brugada syndrome. Large-scale genetic analyses have shown the possibility that CACNA1C is associated with bipolar disorder and subsequently also with schizophrenia. Also, a CACNA1C risk allele has been associated to a disruption in brain connectivity in patients with bipolar disorder, while not or only to a minor degree, in their unaffected relatives or healthy controls.

Interactive pathway map

See also 
 Calcium channel
 Calcium channel associated transcriptional regulator

References

Further reading

External links 
 GeneReviews/NIH/NCBI/UW entry on Brugada syndrome
 
 GeneReviews/NIH/NCBI/UW entry on Timothy Syndrome

Ion channels
Biology of bipolar disorder